The 26th Battalion (New Brunswick) CEF, was an infantry battalion of the Canadian Expeditionary Force during World War I. The 26th Battalion recruited throughout New Brunswick and was mobilized at Saint John, New Brunswick. The 26th Battalion (New Brunswick), CEF, is perpetuated by The Royal New Brunswick Regiment.

History 
The battalion was authorized on 7 November 1914 and embarked for Britain on 15 June 1915. It disembarked in France on 16 September, where it fought as part of the 5th Canadian Infantry Brigade, 2nd Canadian Division in France and Flanders until the end of the war. The battalion was disbanded on 30 August 1920.

Commanding Officers 
The 26th battalion had six Officers Commanding:

Lt.-Col. J.L. McAvity, 15 June 1915 – 29 May 1916
Lt.-Col. A.E.G. McKenzie, DSO, 29 May 1916 – 2 July 1917
Lt.-Col. W.R. Brown, DSO, 2 July 1917 – 4 October 1917
Lt.-Col. A.E.G. McKenzie, DSO, 4 October 1917 – 29 September 1918
Maj. C.G. Porter, DSO, 28 August 1918 – 5 September 1918
Lt.-Col. W.R. Brown, DSO, 5 September 1918-Demobilization

Battle honours 
The 26th Battalion was awarded the following battle honours:

MOUNT SORREL
SOMME, 1916, '18
Flers-Courcelette
Thiepval
Ancre Heights
ARRAS, 1917, '18
Vimy, 1917
Arleux
Scarpe, 1917, '18
HILL 70
Ypres 1917
Passchendaele
AMIENS
HINDENBURG LINE
Canal du Nord
Cambrai, 1918
PURSUIT TO MONS
FRANCE AND FLANDERS, 1915-18

See also 
 List of infantry battalions in the Canadian Expeditionary Force

References

Sources
Canadian Expeditionary Force 1914-1919 by Col. G.W.L. Nicholson, CD, Queen's Printer, Ottawa, Ontario, 1962
The Story of the Fighting 26th, R.W. Gould and S.K.Smith, St John News Co.

External links

026
Military units and formations of New Brunswick
Saint John Fusiliers
Royal New Brunswick Regiment